Ousedale School, is an academy based in Newport Pagnell and Olney, in the City of Milton Keynes, Buckinghamshire, England. The school opened in 1963 to serve the community of Newport Pagnell and its surrounding villages.  A second campus in Olney opened in 2007 to serve students from the north of the Milton Keynes unitary authority area. It is one of the top performing schools in the Milton Keynes UA for A level and GCSE results, and achieved the top 20% of GCSE results nationally in 2019.

Admissions
Ousedale's catchment area includes the towns of Newport Pagnell and Olney, along with the rural villages and hamlets within the Milton Keynes UA east of the M1. Currently there are approximately 2070 students on roll, including a Sixth Form of 420. The School is based on two campuses; the Newport Pagnell campus caters for 1500 children age 11 - 18 and the Olney campus 600 age 11 - 16.

Newport Pagnell campus
The Newport Pagnell campus is housed in some modern buildings.  The main stages of building development since the opening of the school in 1963 have been in 1971, 1975 and 1979.  In 1993, the school gained a new (9 classroom) teaching block.  Accompanying this, have been the extensive remodeling and refurbishment of other teaching areas together with the enhancement of the grounds and the removal of very old temporary accommodation. 1994 saw extensions to the Science Block, to include four additional laboratories together with another music room. Between 2012 and 2015 the Maths Block, Humanities Block and outside courtyard area have seen refurbishments. A purpose-built Sixth Form Centre was opened in September 2000, which has 5 smaller teaching rooms and the social area, the Gallery. The centre was extended in 2009/2010 with a bigger private study area and 6 new class rooms, and again in 2015 to include a larger, two-storey private study area.

The specialist accommodation includes a sports hall, a gymnasium and 3 squash courts, together with extensive playing fields, flood lit tennis courts and a new full-size synthetic pitch. There are 14 science laboratories, 6 design technology rooms and 2 food technology rooms. There is a suite of business studies rooms and also computer rooms.  There are 2 music rooms with 5 practice rooms, 4 art and 2 drama studios. There are 3 canteens: 2 purpose-built and one sixth form.

Olney campus
The new £7m building of Ousedale School opened in Easter 2007, six months behind schedule, built by Jackson Construction. The need for a second campus arose following the Local Education Authority's decision to commence secondary education from year 7 (previously the final year of middle school). The site at Newport Pagnell did not have enough room for another building to hold a year 7, and the government declined to provide enough funding for a completely new site in Newport Pagnell that would accommodate every student. The solution was to build a second campus in Olney for year 7, 8, 9, 10 and 11. This is not as big as the Newport Pagnell campus. The canteen was recently extended as a covered outdoor area in September 2008.

Academic performance
Academic performance has been good with the school achieving in 2010 the best A level results in the Milton Keynes UA, and the best GCSE Maths results. In June 2015 it received recognition from the Department for Education for consistently achieving outstanding results at GCSE. The Ofsted reports of May 2012, May 2016 and January 2020 gave the school a rating of good with some outstanding teaching, in all areas.

Former teachers
 Sir Bruce Liddington, Deputy Head 1981–6, Schools Commissioner DCSF 2006–2009

Former pupils
Letitia Dean (Actress)
David Oldfield (Footballer)
Leah Williamson (Footballer)

References

External links
 School website

Academies in Milton Keynes
Educational institutions established in 1963
Secondary schools in Milton Keynes
1963 establishments in England